Porin Palloilijat or FC PoPa is a Finnish football club, based in the city of Pori in Finland. The club currently plays in the Ykkönen (First Division), the second highest level of Finnish football . The club was established in 1925 but did not operate between 1960 and 1981. It has been the leading football team in Pori since FC Jazz went bankrupt in early 2005.

History
Porin Palloilijat is the oldest team sports club in Pori being over 85 years old.  Bror Weckström had the original idea of forming a new team in Pori and on 16 April 1925 the first meeting of PoPa was held in the café at Pori Theatre.

It was decided to form a team called Porin Palloilijat and to make football and bandy as their main focus. The first Committee members were Erkki Laitinen, J. Kari, Bror Weckström, O. Huhtanen, A. Forsberg and H. Lingvist.  In May 1925 the constitution and rules for the clubwere prepared and the team was registered on 13 May 1925.  They also included ice-hockey, women's basketball and ice-skating within the club's featured programme.  The first chairman was Erkki Laitinen and he was later followed by Veikko Laitinen.

PoPa played their first games at Liisantori and then later at Tiilimäki before moving in 1929 to the football and ice-hockey field at Juhannuslehto. The club later moved to the Herralahti football ground.

PoPa had a rich early history playing 10 seasons in the Suomisarjaa (Finland League) which at that time was the second tier of Finnish football in 1937–39 and 1945–51.

They have had three periods covering 7 seasons in the Kakkonen (Second Division), the third tier of Finnish football in 1989, 2002–03 and 2005–08.

FC PoPa Oy have taken over the responsibility for the sport and financial operation of the principal team since 2007. In season 2007 PoPa played in the Kakkonen (Second Division) in the Western Group, reaching second place just one point short of promotion to the Ykkönen (First Division). In 2008 the team went one better winning the Western Group of Second Division in a crushing manner and were promoted to the Ykkönen for 2009.

The club maintained their rapid progress in 2009 by finishing 4th in the Ykkönen and are well on target of bringing Veikkausliiga football back to Pori.  The key people behind the initiative are Antti Sumiala (sport and managing director), Rami Nieminen (manager / marketing executive), Pertti Lundell (coach) and Risto Puustinen (coach).

From the beginning, the focal point of new Executive Board has been raising the football in Pori and Satakunta back to the top level in Finland. The strategy of FC PoPa is to play attacking and entertaining football, to develop young, talented players for the use of FC PoPa and to sell the most talented players to the foreign professional clubs.

Divisional Movements since 1930
Second Level (12 seasons):  1937–39, 1945–51, 2009–present day
Third Level (7 seasons):   1989, 2002–03, 2005–08

Season to season

Club Structure
PoPa currently has 1 men's team.  There is also a futsal team that plays in the Second Division.  The club runs one junior football team.

2010 season
PoPa are competing in the Ykkönen (First Division) administered by the Football Association of Finland (Suomen Palloliitto). This is the second tier of the Finnish football system.  In 2009 the team finished fourth position in the Ykkönen.

References and sources
 Official Website
 General Website
 Finnish Wikipedia
  Suomen Cup
 Porin Palloilijat Facebook
 Unofficial Supporter Site

Footnotes

PoPa
Sport in Pori
1925 establishments in Finland
Association football clubs established in 1925
Bandy clubs established in 1925
Sport in Satakunta